Scotura leucophleps is a moth of the family Notodontidae. It is found in Nicaragua, Costa Rica and Panama.

The larvae feed on Rinorea panamensis, Rinorea squamata and Rinorea deflexiflora.

References

Moths described in 1909
Notodontidae